Crassula peduncularis, commonly known as purple stonecrop, is a herb in the family Crassulaceae.

It blooms between September and October producing green-yellow-brown-red flowers.

It is found in marshy areas and around ephemeral pools on granite outcrops in the Great Southern, Wheatbelt, South West, Peel and Goldfields-Esperance regions of Western Australia. It is also indigenous to New Zealand.

References

peduncularis
Plants described in 1893
Flora of Western Australia
Saxifragales of Australia